Panatta is an Italian surname. Notable people with the surname include:

Adriano Panatta (born 1950), Italian tennis player
Claudio Panatta (born 1960), Italian tennis player, brother of Adriano

See also
Panetta

Italian-language surnames